Günther Kumpitsch (born 7 July 1960) is an Austrian politician who has been a Member of the National Council for the Freedom Party of Austria (FPÖ) since 2015.

References

1960 births
Living people
Members of the National Council (Austria)
Freedom Party of Austria politicians
Recipients of the Decoration of Honour for Services to the Republic of Austria